The TeST TST-14J BonusJet is a two-seat touring motor glider with a retractable PBS TJ-100 turbine engine, built by TeST in the Czech Republic.  It is an all composite design.

Development and design
The TST-14J is a Desert Aerospace, LLC modification of the TST-14 motorglider with the addition of a retractable jet engine used for self launching. It has a high T-tail. It is a mid wing design with straight tapered wings.  The wing tips carry winglets and there are outboard ailerons, two position flaps and upper surface spoilers.

The fuselage of the TST-14J is built from two half shells which incorporate the straight tapered fin.  The fuselage tapers rearwards, producing an arched shape below.  The tailplane carries a single piece elevator.  The cockpit has a forward hinged, single piece canopy, and a side hinged passenger canopy. The TST-14J has a tailwheel undercarriage, with spatted mainwheels on fuselage-mounted, sprung, cantilever legs.

The 45 lb PBS TJ-100 turbine engine  requires a two-minute cooldown before retracting into the fuselage. The prototype was tested by Bob Carlton, an experienced jet powered glider pilot who flies an aerobatic routine in a Super Salto jet powered glider with the same engine. Sonex Aircraft also uses the same engine, and hired Carlton to test its SubSonex jet-powered homebuilt aircraft.

Specifications

References

External links

TST-14J
2000s Czech sport aircraft
Motor gliders
Mid-wing aircraft
T-tail aircraft
Single-engined jet aircraft